Plymouth Argyle Football Club are an English professional association football club based in Plymouth, Devon. They compete in Football League Two as of the 2015–16 season, the fourth division of the English football league system. The club was formed in 1886 as Argyle Football Club, a name which was retained until 1903 when the club became professional and were elected to the Southern Football League. The club also entered English football's premier knockout competition, the Football Association Challenge Cup, for the first time that same year. The club joined the Football League in 1920, and have competed there since then, achieving multiple league titles, promotions and relegations.

During this time, Plymouth Argyle's first team has competed in a number of nationally contested leagues and knock-out tournaments. Its record against each club faced in these competitions is listed below, in alphabetical order. The team that Plymouth Argyle have met most in competitive matches is Bristol Rovers, having played 133 matches since 1903. Bristol Rovers also account for the club's record number of victories, 57, and their record number of losses, 41. Brentford are the club that Plymouth Argyle have drawn the most against, with 37 drawn matches out of 118.

Key
The records include the results of matches played in the Southern Football League (from 1903 to 1920), the Western Football League (from 1903 to 1909), the Football League (from 1920 to the present day), the FA Cup, the League Cup, the EFL Trophy, the Full Members Cup, the Watney Cup, the Anglo-Scottish Cup, and the Football League Group Cup.
For simplicity, present-day names are used throughout; for example, results against Clapton Orient are integrated into the records of Leyton Orient.
Wartime matches are regarded as unofficial and are excluded.
The season given as the "first" denotes the season in which Plymouth Argyle first played a match against that team.
The season given as the "last" designates the most recent season to have included a match between Plymouth Argyle and that side.
P = matches played; W = matches won; D = matches drawn; L = matches lost; Win% = percentage of total matches won
 † Denotes clubs in the same division as Plymouth Argyle in the 2009–10 season. 
 ‡ Denotes clubs which are now defunct.

All–time statistics

a  Results in all competitions until May 2009 are sourced to Danes, Plymouth Argyle: A Complete Record. Results in all competitions post May 2009 are sourced to BBC Sport, Greens on Screen, and Statto.

Notes

References
General

Specific

League record by opponent
Plymouth Argyle